Olga Arefieva (Arefeva, Russian: Ольга Арефьева) (born 1966 in Verkhnyaya Salda) is a Russian singer-songwriter, poet and musician. 

Her poetry was described by literary critics as a combination of realism and mysticism, possibly inspired by the absurdism of Daniil Kharms or the magic realism of Gabriel Márquez. She is a member of the Union of Russian Writers.

Discography
Batakakumba, Arefieva and band The Ark, 2000
Anatomy, Disk 1 and Disk 2, 2000
 Concert on radio, 2002
 Snow, 2011
 Theater, 2013
 Jan, 2016
 Clay, 2016
 Angel and girl, 2017
 Trybirds, 2017
 Yiao, 2018
 Hina, 2020
 Ko-Mix, 2021

References

External links
Official website (English)
 
 
 Links to selected CD
 Her site on bards.ru
 , Livejournal, Twitter, Vkontakte
Air with Olga Arefieva on Echo of Moscow with Natella Boltyanskaya, 1 March 1998
 Olga Arefieva on Kroogi

Examples of songs on YouTube posted by author
"The Juggler" by Olga Arefieva and group The Ark'
"Not in tact"
"Do you have anything to tell?"
"Autumn"
"Asymmetry"

Russian reggae musicians
Russian women singer-songwriters
Russian women poets
Russian women musicians
Living people
1967 births
Russian singer-songwriters
Soviet women singer-songwriters
Soviet singer-songwriters
20th-century Russian musicians
20th-century Russian women musicians
21st-century Russian musicians
20th-century Russian writers
21st-century Russian writers
20th-century Russian women singers
20th-century Russian singers
21st-century Russian women writers
Russian activists against the 2022 Russian invasion of Ukraine